The 2022 Munster Hurling Cup, also called the Co-Op Superstores Munster Hurling Cup, was an inter-county hurling competition in the province of Munster. Five of the six county teams of Munster competed;  did not compete. The competition was originally cancelled as part of fixture rescheduling, but was reinstated in November 2021. The draw took place on 8 December 2021, and the tournament took place in January 2022. It was renamed the "Munster Hurling Cup" as it is no longer a league system.

Competition format
The competition is a straight knockout. Drawn games go to a penalty shoot-out without the playing of extra-time.

Fixtures and results

Final

League statistics

Top scorers

Top scorers overall

Top scorers in a single game

References

Munster Hurling Cup
Munster Senior Hurling League